The 2018–19 Nemzeti Bajnokság I/B is the 51st season of the Nemzeti Bajnokság I/B, Hungary's second tier Handball league.

Team information
There are 12–12 clubs in the 2 group, with three-three promoted teams from Nemzeti Bajnokság II.

Team changes

Promoted from 2017–18 Nemzeti Bajnokság II
 Nagykanizsai Izzó SE

Relegated from 2017–18 Nemzeti Bajnokság I
 Váci KSE
 Orosházi FKSE

Relegated to 2018–19 Nemzeti Bajnokság II
 KK Ajka
 Tatabánya KC (U20)
 Csurgói KK (U20)
 Törökszentmiklósi KE
 MOL-Pick Szeged

Promoted to 2018–19 Nemzeti Bajnokság I
 Vecsés SE
 Mezőkövesdi KC

Arenas and locations

Western Group
The following 12 clubs compete in the NB I/B (Western) during the 2018–19 season:

Eastern Group
The following 12 clubs compete in the NB I/B (Eastern) during the 2018–19 season:

See also
 2018–19 Magyar Kupa
 2018–19 Nemzeti Bajnokság I
 2018–19 Nemzeti Bajnokság II

References

External links
 Hungarian Handball Federaration 
 hetmeteres.hu

Handball leagues in Hungary
Nemzeti Bajnoksag I/B Men